A Love Like Ours  is the twenty-eighth studio album by American singer Barbra Streisand. It was released in North America on September 21, 1999, and Europe on September 20, 1999. It is her 23rd Top 10 album in the US. This was Streisand's first commercial release since her marriage to actor James Brolin. Much of the material was inspired by this event. As such, the disc booklet contains images of her and Brolin.

The album did not achieve the success of Streisand's two previous albums, debuting at No. 6 in the US with sales of 145,000 copies in the first week. It was eventually certified Gold and Platinum.

"We Must Be Loving Right" was previously recorded by George Strait on his 1993 album Easy Come, Easy Go. Both Strait's original and Streisand's cover were produced by Tony Brown.

Singles

"If You Ever Leave Me", a duet with country star Vince Gill was released to country radio. It peaked at No. 62 on the Billboard's Hot Country Songs chart and stayed there for 6 weeks. In the UK the single peaked at No. 26.

"I've Dreamed of You" was also released and peaked at No. 22 on the Billboard Hot Single Sales chart and No. 12 on the Hot Canadian Digital Singles chart.

Track listing 
 "I've Dreamed of You" (Rolf Løvland, Ann Hampton Callaway) – 4:46
 "Isn't It a Pity?" (George Gershwin, Ira Gershwin) – 5:22
 "The Island" (Ivan Lins, Vitor Martins, Alan Bergman, Marilyn Bergman) – 4:37
 "Love Like Ours" (Dave Grusin, A. Bergman, M. Bergman) – 3:59
 "If You Ever Leave Me" (Duet with Vince Gill) (Richard Marx) – 4:38
 "We Must Be Loving Right" (Roger Brown, Clay Blaker) – 3:37
 "If I Never Met You" (Tom Snow, Dean Pitchford) – 3:38
 "It Must Be You" (Steve Dorff, Stephony Smith) – 3:29
 "Just One Lifetime" (Snow, Melissa Manchester) – 4:18
 "If I Didn't Love You" (Bruce Roberts, Junior Miles) – 4:18
 "Wait" (Michel Legrand, A. Bergman, M. Bergman) – 4:10
 "The Music That Makes Me Dance" (Jule Styne, Bob Merrill) – 4:35

Personnel
Adapted from the album's liner notes.
 Walter Afanasieff – keyboards, programming
 Robbie Buchanan – synthesizer
 Jon Clarke – recorder
 Jim Cox, Michael Lang – piano
 Paulinho da Costa – percussion
 George Doering, Dean Parks – guitar
 Bruce Dukov – violin
 Stuart Duncan – fiddle
 David Foster, Richard Marx – keyboards
 Paul Franklin – steel guitar
 Vince Gill, Donald Kirkpatrick – acoustic guitar, electric guitar
 Reggie Hamilton, Lee Sklar, Nathan East – bass guitar
 Pete Hume, Felipe Elgueta, Greg Bieck, Steve Skinner – programming
 Ralph Humphrey, John Robinson – drums
 John Jorgenson, Michael Landau, Kamil Rustam – electric guitar
 Kenny G – tenor saxophone
 Tommy Morgan – harmonica
 Randy Waldman – piano, keyboards, synthesizer

Orchestra on "The Island" arranged and conducted by Jorge Calandrelli.

Strings on "We Must Be Loving Right" conducted and arranged by William Ross.

Production
 Walter Afanasieff – track 3
 Tony Brown – track 6
 David Foster – track 10
 David Foster and Richard Marx – track 5
 Arif Mardin – tracks 8, 9
 Barbra Streisand – tracks 1, 2, 4, 7, 11, 12

Charts

Weekly charts

Year-end charts

Certifications and sales

References

1999 albums
Barbra Streisand albums
Albums produced by Walter Afanasieff
Albums produced by Tony Brown (record producer)
Albums produced by David Foster
Albums produced by Arif Mardin
Albums produced by Richard Marx
Columbia Records albums